George Cathie may refer to:

 George Cathie (footballer, born 1876) (1876–1958), Australian rules footballer with Melbourne 
 George Cathie (footballer, born 1905) (1905–1967), Australian rules footballer with Hawthorn